The Secretary-General of the Standing Committee of the National People's Congress (NPC) is a political office in the People's Republic of China. The Secretary-General along with the Chairperson and Vice Chairpersons constitute the Council of Chairpersons of the Standing Committee. 

The Secretary-General oversees the administrative operations of the General Office of the Standing Committee. The Standing Committee elects the Secretary-General from within its ranks.

Officeholders

Notes

References

See also 

 Standing Committee of the National People's Congress
 Chairperson
 Vice-Chairpersons
 National Committee of the Chinese People's Political Consultative Conference
 Secretary-General

Members of the Standing Committee of the National People's Congress
1949 establishments in China